Hébuterne is a commune in the Pas-de-Calais department in the Hauts-de-France region of France.

Geography

History
Formerly within the ancient county of Artois, the village was redesignated within the new Department of the Pas de Calais after the French Revolution.

First World War

For most of the First World War, Hébuterne was in the front line of the Western Front and occupied by the Allied Forces entrenched on the eastern side of the village facing the Imperial German Army 800 yards beyond occupying the village of Gommecourt. In mid-summer 1916, the 56th (London) Division of the British Army carried out an attack from Hébuterne in an attempt to capture Gommecourt as a part of the Battle of the Somme offensive, which failed with severe losses.

By the war's end, the village was a complete wreck due to the violence to which it had been subject during its front line career, and it had to be completely re-built in the 1920s.

Places of interest
 The church of St Vaast, rebuilt, as was most of the village, after the First World War.
 The Commonwealth War Graves Commission cemetery.

Population

See also
 Communes of the Pas-de-Calais department

References

External links

 The CWGC cemetery

Communes of Pas-de-Calais